The Armed Forces Staff, in the meaning of General staff, of the German Bundeswehr (literal: Command staff of the armed forces) was the central department of the Federal Ministry of Defence (MOD) in direct subordination to the Inspector General of the Bundeswehr (en: Chief of Staff of the Federal Armed Forces) and one of the five staff headquarters in the military command of the German Bundeswehr.

The Armed Forces Staff was thus at the same time a supreme military command authority and the top level ministerial staff organisation, authorised, mandated and competent to overall military defence planning, basics and concepts of military policy, planning of operational command and control, as well as to plans a policy of personnel education and training.

In 2012, there existed supreme military command authorities in the MOD as follows:
Armed Forces Staff (Führungsstab der Streitkräfte – Fü S; General Staff of the Armed Forces)
Army Staff (Führungsstab des Heeres – Fü H; Army General Staff)
Air Force Staff (Führungsstab der Luftwaffe – Fü L; Air Force General Staff)
Navy Staff (Führungsstab der Marine – Fü M)
Medical Staff (Führungsstab des Sanitätsdienstes – Fü San; Medical Service Staff)

Parts of these top-level staff authorities were merged in order to establish the new high command authorities of the German Bundeswehr as follow:
Army Command (Kommando Heer – Kdo Heer)
Air Force Command (Kommando Luftwaffe – Kdo Luftwaffe)
Navy Command (Kommando Marine – Kdo Marine)

In line to the new Bundeswehr command structure, the remaining staff elements were used on the MOD level to form:
a Planning Division
an Armed Forces Command and Control Division and
a Strategy and Operations Division.

History 
After World War II 1945 and in accordance with the Potsdam Agreement the establishment of autonomous German armed forces, including headquarters on general staff level, were forbidden. However, in line to the re-armament from Mai 5, 1955, in the new established Bundeswehr the designation Generalstab (general staff) was not more used, thus there existed tasks and missions on general staff level. This was the reason to establish the Armed Forces Staff as top level command organization in the MOD.

Mission 
The Armed Forces Staff received tasks and orders direct from the Inspector General of the Bundeswehr. In addition, it was within its responsibility to handle command and control specific affairs, related to the Armed forces basic. This characterised the Armed Forces Staff as supreme military command authority.

Command 
The Inspector General of the Bundeswehr, a four-star rank (general or admiral), commanded the Armed Forces Staff. The Chief of Staff coordinated the staff work. According to the so-called Bundeswehr planning he was authorised to issue directives to the Inspectors General of the services Army, Air Force, and Navy, as well as to Inspector of the Joint Support Service Staff and Medical Service Staff.

June 1, 2003, the Armed Forces Staff and Joint Support Service Staff''' were combined into a common staff authority in the MOD.

 Organisation 
The Armed Forces Staff consisted of seven staff divisions (7 Stabsabteilungen) with a total number of 42 branches (42 Referate).
 Staff division Fü S I  – The chief of that particular division was Deputy Chief of Staff – Civic education and leadership, personnel, training, with the branches:
Fü S I/1 – Principles of manning requirements
Fü S I/2 – Basics of personnel planning, personnel situation, and recruitment situation of civil and military personnel of the armed forces, reserve component issues
Fü S I/3 – Internal and social situation of the armed forces
Fü S I/4 – Civic education and leadership
Fü S I/5 – Basic training affairs of the armed forces
 Staff division Fü S II – Military intelligence of the Bundeswehr, with the branches:
 Fü S II/1 – Basic affairs and concept of military intelligence
 Fü S II/2 – Strategic reconnaissance; security officer of signal, electronic, and special  reconnaissance; control authority of the Chief of Air Force Staff to military intelligence    
Fü S II/3 – National risk evaluation; situation of other states; control authority of the Chief of Army Staff to military intelligence   
 Fü S II/4 – Military security of the Bundeswehr; control authority of the Chief of Navy Staff to military intelligence   
 Fü S II/5 – Foreign military attachés; situation of other states
 Fü S II/6 – Geographic information system of the Bundeswehr; navigation in the Bundewehr
 Staff division Fü S III – Military policy and armament control, with the branches
 Fü S III/1 – Basics of military policy; bilateral relations
Fü S III/2 – Basics of military strategy; German-French working group on military cooperation; studiesFA 01
Fü S III/2 – NATO; Euro Atlantic Partnership Council (EAPC); basic questions of military representation of the interest in organizations; Partnership for Peace (PfP)
Fü S III/3 – European Union; Western European Union; basic questions of military representation of the interest in these organizations; European control officer of MOD Germany
Fü S III/4 – Arms control; disarmament; non-distribution 
Fü S III/5 – Military political basics on operations and exercises
 Staff division Fü S IV – Logistics, ABC-Defence and security tasks  
Fü S IV/1 – Basic matters of logistics of the Bundeswehr; logistic control of the Bundeswehr; international logistic cooperation
Fü S IV/2 – Material / supply management of the Bundeswehr
Fü S IV/3 – ABC-Defence and security tasks of the Bundeswehr; training areas and local training facilities 
Fü S IV/4 – Mobility and transport logistic of the Bundeswehr 
Fü S IV/5 – Planning of the Bundeswehr; armament and in service support management of the armed forces; authorized representative of IAGFA
 Staff division Fü S V – Commitment (also: engagement or mission) of the Bundeswehr; from June 1, 2008, reorganised to Operations Control Staff of the Federal Ministry of Defence (Einsatzführungsstab des Bundesministeriums der Verteidigung) in direct subordination to the Inspector General of the Bundeswehr and not any more part of the Armed Forces Staff Staff division Fü S VI – Planning, with the branches:
Fü S VI/1 – Basic affairs and controlling Bundeswehr planning, process responsibility main process Bundeswehr planning, BRH-affairs Armed Forces Staff'' / Joint Support Service (Fü S / SKB) 
Fü S VI/2 – Conception of the Bundeswehr, transformation CD&E
Fü S VI/3 – Capability analysis
Fü S VI/4 – Bundeswehr planning
Fü S VI/5 – Contributions to the budget and finance planning of the armed forces/Joint Support Service; coordination management of the armed forces
Fü S VI/6 – Multinational armed forces planning, capability development, interoperability/standardisation; 
Fü S VI/7 – Basics/further development of the armed forces
Staff division Fü S VII – Organisation, deployment, infrastructure, operations support, with the branches: 
Fü S VII/1 – Basic affairs of the military organisation; business dealings, correspondence or exchange of letters in the armed forces; regulations and standardisation agreements 
 Fü S VII/2 – Organisation of the Joint Support Service 
 Fü S VII/3 – Coordination of the deployment of the Bundeswehr and utilisation of premises; deployment of the armed forces basis; enquiry group optimizing of locations and premises 
 Fü S VII/4 – Basic affairs of infrastructure of the armed forces; infrastructure requirements and – planning of the armed forces 
 Fü S VII/5 – Information and communication technology; radio frequency spectrum prerogative affairs

List Chiefs of Staff 
The Chief of staff did normally have the OF7-rank of a Generalmajors or Konteradmiral.

External links 
 Weblink of the Armed Forces Staff / des Führungsstabes der Streitkräfte

Bundeswehr
Staff (military)